Ali Kahi (also Romanized as ‘Alī Kāhī) is a village in Kharqan Rural District, Bastam District, Shahrud County, Semnan Province, Iran. At the 2006 census, its population was 88, in 26 families.

References 

Populated places in Shahrud County